Ytre Rendal Church is a parish church of the Church of Norway in Rendalen Municipality in Innlandet county, Norway. It is located in the village of Otnes. It is the church for the Ytre Rendal parish which is part of the Nord-Østerdal prosti (deanery) in the Diocese of Hamar. The red, wooden church was built in an cruciform design in 1751 using plans drawn up by an unknown architect. The church seats about 180 people.

Jacob Breda Bull is buried in the church graveyard.

History
The earliest existing historical records of the church date back to the year 1444, but the church was not new that year.

This new church eventually fell into disrepair and around 1745, it was decided to build a new church. It was a timber-framed cruciform church. Originally, the church exterior was unpainted. In 1857, the exterior was painted red. During a restoration in 1878, the church was painted white. In 1930, the church was painted red once again.

Media gallery

See also
List of churches in Hamar

References

Rendalen
Churches in Innlandet
Cruciform churches in Norway
Wooden churches in Norway
18th-century Church of Norway church buildings
Churches completed in 1751
13th-century establishments in Norway